Albert Beech (24 September 1912 – 20 June 1985) was an English footballer who played as a defender for Port Vale, Altrincham, Huddersfield Town, Notts County, and Northwich Victoria. He played in the First Division with Huddersfield and won the Cheshire Senior Cup with Altrincham.

Early and personal life
Albert Beech was born on 24 September 1912 in Fenton, Staffordshire; he married and later died in Fenton.

Career
Beech played for Leek Alexandra and Stoke St.Peter's, before joining Port Vale in November 1930. He turned professional in September 1931 and made his only appearance for the club in a 2–1 home defeat to Manchester United on 28 November 1931. He left on a free transfer in May 1933 and moved on to Altrincham. He was the club's top-scorer in the 1933–34 campaign, scoring 24 goals in 49 games, including a hat-trick against Crewe Alexandra Reserves in a 6–2 win on 2 December. He won the Cheshire Senior Cup with the club, as Altrincham beat Congleton Town 1–0 in the final at Edgeley Park. Having proven himself in the Cheshire County League, he was signed by First Division club Huddersfield Town in June 1934, alongside left-back James Taylor. He played three matches in the 1934–35 campaign. He scored four goals in sixteen games during the 1935–36 season, with his first goal in the Football League coming on 14 April in a 1–1 draw with Portsmouth. He featured just three times in the 1936–37 season, his final appearance coming in a 5–0 defeat at Middlesbrough on 27 February. He was sold on to Notts County for a £1,000 fee in June 1937. He played thirteen Third Division South matches in the 1937–38 season. He then returned to Fenton and played for Northwich Victoria, before World War II ended his professional career at the age of 27.

Career statistics
Source:

Honours
Altrincham
Cheshire Senior Cup: 1934

References

People from Fenton, Staffordshire
Footballers from Stoke-on-Trent
English footballers
Association football defenders
Port Vale F.C. players
Altrincham F.C. players
Huddersfield Town A.F.C. players
Notts County F.C. players
Northwich Victoria F.C. players
English Football League players
1912 births
1985 deaths